This article contains the discography of jazz guitarist Joe Pass as leader, sideman, and collaborator.

As leader or co-leader

Compilation 

 2001 The Complete Pacific Joe Pass Quartet Sessions

As sideman 
With Ella Fitzgerald
 1973 Newport Jazz Festival: Live at Carnegie Hall
 1974 Fine and Mellow
 1974 Ella in London
 1981 Ella Abraca Jobim
 1982 The Best Is Yet to Come

With Richard "Groove" Holmes
 1962 After Hours
 1962 Somethin' Special
 1966 Tell It Like It Tis

With Les McCann
 1962 On Time
 1963 Soul Hits

With Carmen McRae
 1972 The Great American Songbook
 1973 It Takes a Whole Lot of Human Feeling

With Oscar Peterson
 1974 The Good Life 
 1975 The Oscar Peterson Big 6 at Montreux
 1979 Night Child
 1982 Face to Face, Peterson/Freddie Hubbard
 1983 A Tribute to My Friends
 1983 If You Could See Me Now
 1986 Oscar Peterson Live!
 1986 Time After Time
 1986 Oscar Peterson + Harry Edison + Eddie "Cleanhead" Vinson
 1986 Benny Carter Meets Oscar Peterson, Benny Carter/Peterson

With Gerald Wilson
 1962 Moment of Truth
 1963 Portraits
 1965 On Stage
 1968 Everywhere

With others
 1962 Grab This!, Johnny Griffin
 1963 Folk 'n' Flute, Bud Shank
 1964 Stretchin' Out, The Crusaders
 1965 All Through the Night: Julie London Sings the Choicest of Cole Porter, Julie London
 1969 Reelin' with the Feelin', Charles Kynard
 1969 The Original Cleanhead, Eddie "Cleanhead" Vinson
 1970 Blood, Chet and Tears, Chet Baker
 1971 Roger Kellaway Cello Quartet, Roger Kellaway
 1972 Maestro, Moacir Santos
 1974 Duke's Big 4, Duke Ellington Quartet
 1974 Dizzy Gillespie's Big 4, Dizzy Gillespie
 1975 Happy Time, Roy Eldridge
 1975 Zoot Sims and the Gershwin Brothers, Zoot Sims
 1976 The King, Benny Carter
 1976 Carter, Gillespie Inc., Benny Carter and Dizzy Gillespie
 1978 How Long Has This Been Going On?, Sarah Vaughan
 1980 The Alternate Blues, Clark Terry, Freddie Hubbard, Dizzy Gillespie plus Oscar Peterson
 1980 Memories of Duke, Clark Terry
 1983 Mostly Blues...and Some Others, Count Basie
 1988 My Kind of Trouble, Benny Carter
 1989 Autumn Leaves, Tommy Gumina

References

Pass, Joe
 
Pass, Joe